Roy is a fictional character from Nintendo's Fire Emblem video game series. He first appears in the 2001 crossover fighting game Super Smash Bros. Melee as a representative character from the Fire Emblem series along with Marth. He is the lead character of Fire Emblem: The Binding Blade. Within the story, Roy is the son of Eliwood, and heir presumptive of Pherae, who eventually becomes a major military leader. Roy's inclusion in Melee has been noted by video game publications for its role in increasing brand awareness for the Fire Emblem series as a whole outside of its native Japan, which encouraged Nintendo to localize the series for international distribution. Roy continues to make recurring appearances in subsequent Fire Emblem media, such as a manga series and spinoff video games.

Concept and design 
Roy was initially designed by Masayuki Horikawa, then being handled by Eiji Kaneda. Roy who was originally named Ike was at first created for the cancelled game Fire Emblem 64 but only him and a character named Karel survived the transition to Fire Emblem: The Binding Blade. The character of Roy was designed to appeal to younger players, and was also given a strong character in contrast to earlier recent titles. He was also made to be a free-spirited and emphatic character so he appealed to as wide an audience as possible. For Fire Emblem: The Blazing Blade, Roy was designed by Sachiko Wada.

When developing Super Smash Bros. Melee, Masahiro Sakurai wanted to include more characters who could cross blades with Link from The Legend of Zelda due to his personal preference for sword fighting characters. Sakurai campaigned for Roy's inclusion in Smash. Roy and Marth were not removed for the international versions of Smash, giving Western audiences in particular their first wider look at the Fire Emblem series through the characters.

In response to fan backlash against the addition of further Fire Emblem characters as DLC for Super Smash Bros. Ultimate, game director Masahiro Sakurai conceded that while characters from the series is overrepresented in the playable roster for Ultimate, he maintained that it is an unfounded concern and the development team are diligent in ensuring that each character along with the game as a whole would be balanced properly.

Appearances 
Roy's first video game appearance is 2001's Super Smash Bros. Melee. He was reintroduced into the series as downloadable content (DLC) for Super Smash Bros for Nintendo 3DS and Wii U, and appears as part of the base roster in the series' 2018 entry, Super Smash Bros. Ultimate.

Roy is the lead character of Fire Emblem: The Binding Blade. The story begins when King Zephiel, ruler of the kingdom of Bern, finishes the brutal conquest of Ilia and Sacae and sets his sights on Lycia. In a small region called Pherae, Roy, the son of Pherae's ruling marquess Eliwood, is forced to return home when Bern begins its invasion. As Eliwood is unable to battle due to illness, Roy is assigned command of Lycia's army. Eventually, Roy assumes command of the army of Etruria.

The next instalment after The Binding Blade, Fire Emblem: The Blazing Blade, is a prequel which features a younger Eliwood as one of its protagonists. Roy appears during the game's epilogue, where Eliwood reunites with his comrade Hector and their respective children are introduced to each other. Roy is available as a playable character in Fire Emblem Awakening as DLC. Roy also appears in Fire Emblem Heroes. He later appears as an Emblem character in Fire Emblem Engage.

In other media
Roy appears in the Fire Emblem: The Champion's Blade manga, first published prior to the release of The Binding Blade and takes place concurrently with the events of the game. Roy does not reappear in the 2008 entry Super Smash Bros. Brawl, but was remade in a notable fanmade mod known as Project M.

Promotion and merchandise
To promote his appearance in Super Smash Bros for Nintendo 3DS and Wii U, an amiibo figure of Roy was featured as an exclusive release at GameStop. In 2019, plushies depicting Roy and other Fire Emblem characters were released.

Reception 
Roy's appearance in Melee, alongside Marth's, introduced the Fire Emblem series to players outside of Japan. It was in part because of his inclusion that Nintendo began localizing and releasing Fire Emblem games internationally, beginning with the seventh title in the series. Due to the popular demand from Japanese fans, Roy was added in Super Smash Bros. for Nintendo 3DS and Wii U as a DLC character. Chris Carter from Destructoid welcomed Nintendo's decision to reintroduce Roy and considered him his "personal favorite", although he found that the character played quite differently  in Super Smash Bros. for Nintendo 3DS and Wii U compared to his previous iteration in Melee or to other Fire Emblem characters.

On the other hand, Roy's continued presence in the Smash series had invited criticism from some quarters. In 2007, Lucas M. Thomas from IGN said that Roy's moveset in Melee overlapped too much with Marth's and drew an unfavorable comparison to Ike, a playable character set to be introduced in 2008's Super Smash Bros. Brawl and whom Thomas perceived to be more distinctive. Gavin Jasper of Den of Geek downplayed Roy's significance, and claimed that the character was added to Melee as a gamble because The Binding Blade was still under development at the time and Nintendo wanted to promote the game well ahead of its release. Cecilia D'Anastasio criticized Roy for being the same sword fighter character archetype as fellow Fire Emblem characters Lucina, Marth and Chrom, all of whom were set to be included in the playable roster of Ultimate. Commenting on Roy's 30th-place ranking on a 2018 tier list of Smash playable characters published by Polygon shortly before the game launched, Jeremy Parish expressed a preference for Roy Koopa, a Koopaling character instead.

In his review of The Binding Blade, Mike Moehnke of RPGamer criticized Roy's weak in-game attributes for the majority of the game, to the point where his presence detracts from an otherwise satisfactory gameplay experience.
Marianne Penn of TheGamer concurred that Roy is one of the series' weakest lords and a difficult character to optimize for gameplay viability, which is a stark contrast from his playable appearances in the Smash series. Penn felt that Roy is a decent character in terms of personality, and that his popularity is "rightfully warranted" in spite of his glaring flaws. In North American Fire Emblem character popularity polls running up to the release of Fire Emblem Heroes, Roy was ranked the second favorite male character behind Ike . The top four characters in the polls received new in-game costumes; Heather Alexandra of Kotaku has praised Roy's original costume by stating that "Roy’s outfit hits all the notes of overclass imagery one", but criticized that Roy remains as a red-colored unit. Ricky Berg from Nintendo Wire looked forward to seeing the release of a Binding Blade remake with localization; he opined that the brand awareness surrounding the character would serve a hypothetical remake well, noting that part of the appeal for players would be to discover the canon character's original personality, as he is less hot-blooded compared to his characterization in the Smash series.

References 

Fictional swordfighters in video games
Fictional war veterans
Fire Emblem characters
Male characters in video games
Nintendo protagonists
Teenage characters in video games
Role-playing video game characters
Super Smash Bros. fighters
Video game characters introduced in 2001
Video game characters with fire or heat abilities
Video game protagonists